The Gymea Gorillas Junior Rugby League Football Club is a rugby league football club that is based in the Sydney suburb of Gymea and competes in the Cronulla-Sutherland District Rugby Football League. The club is based out of Gymea where its headquarters are located and usually draws on the large majority of its junior players from that suburb and the surrounding areas of Kirrawee, Sutherland, Grays Point, Sylvania and Kareela.

The Gymea Gorillas club currently fields teams from Under 6 age groups all the way up to A Grade and has produced several international players including former Australian captain Greg Pierce.  Currently Gymea Gorillas club fields 35 teams, equalling with De La Salle JRLFC for the most teams within the CSDRFL Area.

At the end of 2006 Gymea Gorillas JRLFC was awarded with both the junior and senior club of the year within the Cronulla-Sutherland District Rugby Football League.  As the 2006 season proved to be very successful for Gymea Gorillas JRLFC in the senior grades; attaining both the Under 16s and Under 21s Premierships.

The 2007 season saw further success for the club with it taking out the A Grade premiership over Como Jannali

2012 saw the club enter its 50th year with a record of 39 teams representing the club from ages 6 thru to A grade.

Notable players 

Reece Blayney

See also

External links
Official website
LeagueNet Gymea Gorillas website

Rugby league teams in Sydney
Rugby clubs established in 1962
1962 establishments in Australia